Pristimantis nephophilus is a species of frog in the family Strabomantidae. It is found in the San Martin Region of northern Peru and adjacent Zamora-Chinchipe Province of southern Ecuador.
Its natural habitat are montane and cloud forests. It is threatened by habitat loss caused by agriculture, selective logging, and human settlement.

References

nephophilus
Amphibians of Ecuador
Amphibians of Peru
Amphibians described in 1999
Taxonomy articles created by Polbot